Henry Valentine Stafford-Jerningham, 9th Baron Stafford DL (2 January 1802 – 30 November 1884), known as Henry Jerningham until 1824 and styled The Honourable Henry Stafford-Jerningham between 1824 and 1851, was a British peer and politician.

Background
Stafford was the son of George Stafford-Jerningham, 8th Baron Stafford, and Frances Henrietta Sulyarde, daughter of Edward Sulyarde of Haughley Park. His father had succeeded as seventh Baronet of Costessey in 1809. After his mother's death in 1832, his father married Elizabeth Caton, second daughter Richard Caton and Mary Carroll Caton (a daughter of Charles Carroll of Carrollton).

In 1821, Henry was admitted to Magdalene College, Cambridge. In 1824, his father managed to obtain a reversal of the attainder of the barony of Stafford (the attainder had been imposed on his ancestor William Howard, 1st Viscount Stafford and 1st Baron Stafford in 1680). The family assumed by Royal licence the additional surname of Stafford at the same time.

Political career
Stafford was returned as a Whig to Parliament for Pontefract at the 1830 general election, a seat he held until the dissolution of Parliament in December 1834; he did not stand again at the 1835 general election. In 1851 he succeeded his father in the barony and entered the House of Lords.

Personal life
Lord Stafford was twice married. He married firstly Julia Barbara Howard on 12 February 1829. Julia was the second daughter of Elizabeth (née Maycock) Howard (daughter of William Maycock) and Edward Charles Howard, a younger brother of Bernard Howard, 12th Duke of Norfolk.

After her death in November 1856, he married secondly to Emma Eliza Gerard on 12 September 1859. Emma was a daughter of Frederick Sewallis Gerard and Mary Anne (née Wilkinson) Gerard (daughter of Rev. Thomas Wilkinson).

He died at the family seat of Costessey Park, Norfolk, in November 1884, aged 82, and was succeeded in the barony and baronetcy by his nephew, Augustus Frederick Fitzherbert Stafford-Jerningham.  After his death, Lady Stafford remarried to Basil Thomas Fitzherbert (father of Edward Fitzherbert, 13th Baron Stafford from his first marriage), before her death in November 1912.

References

External links 
 
 Henry Valentine Stafford-Jerningham, 9th Baron Stafford at the National Portrait Gallery, London.
 Jerningham, Frances Dillon (1896). The Jerningham letters (1780-1843) Being excerpts from the correspondence and diaries of the Honourable Lady Jerningham and of her daughter Lady Bedingfeld. Volume I & II. Cornell University Library. London, R. Bentley and son.

1802 births
1884 deaths
Alumni of Magdalene College, Cambridge
Barons Stafford (1640 creation)
Deputy Lieutenants of Norfolk
Members of the Parliament of the United Kingdom for English constituencies
UK MPs 1830–1831
UK MPs 1831–1832
UK MPs 1832–1835
UK MPs who inherited peerages